The Levine Science Research Center (LSRC) is a  facility on Duke University's west campus located at 308 Research Drive Durham, NC  27708.  The LSRC is currently the largest single-site interdisciplinary research facility in the U.S.  Its classrooms are shared by several departments, but the majority of its offices and laboratories are utilized by the Nicholas School of the Environment, the Pratt School of Engineering, the Center for Cognitive Neuroscience and Developmental and the departments of Computer Science, Pharmacology and Cancer Biology and Cell and Molecular Biology.  The building was named for Leon Levine, the CEO of Family Dollar Stores.

References

External links
 Pratt School of Engineering
 Duke University

Duke University campus
Neuroscience research centers in the United States
Research institutes in North Carolina